Saman Faezi (born 23 August 1991 in Tehran) is an Iranian volleyball player who plays as a middle blocker for the Iranian national team.

Honours

National team
World Grand Champions Cup
: Osaka, Japan, 2017
Asian Games
: Jakarta-Palembang, Indonesia, 2018
Asian Cup
: Nakhon Pathom, Thailand, 2016
U19 World Championship
: Jesolo and Bassano del Grappa, Italy, 2009
Asian U19 Championship
: Colombo, Sri Lanka, 2008

Club
Iranian Super League
: 2014-15 (Paykan)

Individual
Best Middle Blocker: 2008 Asian U18 Championship
Best Middle Blocker: 2010-11 Iranian Super League
Best Middle Blocker: Nursultan Nazarbayev President’s Cup, 2013

References

External links 

 

1991 births
Living people
Iranian men's volleyball players
Asian Games medalists in volleyball
Volleyball players at the 2018 Asian Games
Medalists at the 2018 Asian Games
Asian Games gold medalists for Iran
21st-century Iranian people